Vollmer is a family name. Notable people with the name include:

Adolph Friedrich Vollmer, German landscape and marine painter and graphic artist
Andy Vollmer, SEC General Counsel
Antje Vollmer, (1943–2023), German politician
August Vollmer, American police chief
Brian Vollmer, Canadian singer
Clyde Vollmer, American baseball player
Dana Vollmer, American swimmer
Erika Vollmer, German tennis player
Grace Vollmer, American painter
Gerhard Vollmer, German physicist and philosopher
Gustavo J. Vollmer, Venezuelan scout
Heinrich Vollmer, German small-arms designer
Henry Vollmer, American politician
Jana Vollmer, German beach volleyball player
Joan Vollmer, American poet
Jürgen Vollmer, German photographer
Patrick M. Vollmer (born 1969), House of Lords Librarian
Richard W. Vollmer, Jr., American judge
Sebastian Vollmer, American football player
Tiffany Vollmer, American voice actress

See also
Vollmer House, historic house in San Francisco, California
Hiram Price/Henry Vollmer House in Davenport, Iowa
Vollmer Peak, a mountain in the Berkeley Hills
Craigmont, Idaho, city formed in 1920 after the merging of Vollmer and Ilo

Surnames from given names

German-language surnames